John Douglass House, also known as the Governor Sproul Birthplace, is a historic home located at Colerain Township in Lancaster County, Pennsylvania. It is a -story, five bay stone dwelling with a center hall plan in the Georgian style.  The house was built about 1769, with a remodeling sometime after 1815 when a summer kitchen was added and the original walk-in fireplace was filled in.  The property was restored in 2007.  Also on the property are a contributing bank barn, log smokehouse, and the ruins of a stone carriage shed. It was the birthplace of Pennsylvania Governor William Cameron Sproul (1870–1928).

It was listed on the National Register of Historic Places in 1990.

References 

Houses on the National Register of Historic Places in Pennsylvania
Georgian architecture in Pennsylvania
Houses completed in 1769
Houses in Lancaster County, Pennsylvania
National Register of Historic Places in Lancaster County, Pennsylvania